The singles competition of the 2002 Britannic Asset Management International Championships was part of the 28th edition of the Eastbourne International tennis tournament, Tier II of the 2002 WTA Tour. Lindsay Davenport was the defending champion but did not compete that year. Chanda Rubin won in the final 6–1, 6–3 against Anastasia Myskina.

Seeds
A champion seed is indicated in bold text while text in italics indicates the round in which that seed was eliminated. The top four seeds received a bye to the second round.

  Jelena Dokić (second round)
  Sandrine Testud (second round)
  Daniela Hantuchová (semifinals)
  Silvia Farina Elia (quarterfinals)
  Meghann Shaughnessy (quarterfinals)
  Iroda Tulyaganova (second round)
  Patty Schnyder (first round)
  Tamarine Tanasugarn (first round)

Draw

Final

Section 1

Section 2

External links
 2002 Britannic Asset Management International Championships Draw

Singles
Britannic Asset Management International Championships